Dabila is a town in the Garu district in the Upper East region of Ghana.

Facilities 

 Dabila Community Health and Planning Services (CHPS)

References 

Populated places in the Upper East Region